Zemlyansk is a rural locality (a selo) and the administrative center of Zemlyanskoye Rural Settlement, Semiluksky District, Voronezh Oblast, Russia. The population was  3,043 as of 2010. There are 37 streets.

Geography 
Zemlyansk is located 36 km northwest of Semiluki (the district's administrative centre) by road. Dolgoye is the nearest rural locality.

References 

Rural localities in Semiluksky District
Zemlyansky Uyezd